June 6 - Eastern Orthodox Church calendar - June 8

All fixed commemorations below celebrated on June 20 by Orthodox Churches on the Old Calendar.

For June 7th, Orthodox Churches on the Old Calendar commemorate the Saints listed on May 25.

Saints

 Martyrs Aesia and Susanna, disciples of St. Pancratius of Taormina (1st century)
 Virgin-martyr Potamiaena (193-211): 
 and with her, martyrs: Plutarch, Serenus, Heraclides, Heron, Herais, Marcella, and Basilides, of Alexandria. 
 Martyr Zenaida (Zenais) of Caesarea in Palestine, Wonderworker.
 Hieromartyr Theodotus of Ancyra, Bishop (303)  (see also: May 18)
 Hieromartyr Marcellinus, Pope of Rome, and with him Martyrs Claudius, Cyrinus, and Antoninus (304)  (see also: April 26 - in the West) 
 Saint Marcellus, Pope of Rome, and with him the Martyrs (304-310):  (see also: January 16 - in the West) 
 Deacons Sisinius and Cyriacus;
 Soldiers Smaragdus, Largus, Apronian, Saturninus, Pappias, and Maurus; 
 Crescentian, Priscilla, Lucia, and Princess Artemia. 
 Martyr Lycarion of Tanis (Hermopolis) in Egypt.
 Martyrs John and Tarasios, by the sword.
 Martyrs Cyria, Kaleria (Valeria), and Maria, of Caesarea in Palestine (4th century)  (see also: June 6 )
 Saint Daniel of Scetis in Egypt (420)
 Saints Stephen and Anthimus of Constantinople, Priests, of the Fervent Ones ("the Ever-Vigilant") (5th century)
 Saint Sebastiani the Wonderworker.
 Venerable Anatolius the Sinaite.

Pre-Schism Western saints

 Saint Paul I of Constantinople, an Archbishop of Constantinople whose episcopate was largely spent in exile for Orthodoxy (350)  (see also: November 6 - in the East) 
 Saint Colmán of Dromore, Bishop of Dromore, Ireland (6th century)
 Venerable Vulphy (Wulflagius), a priest near Abbeville in the north of France who lived and reposed as a hermit, wonderworker (c. 643)
 Venerable Modwenna, the successor of St. Hilda as Abbess of Whitby (c. 695 or 699)
 Venerable martyr Aventinus, born in Bagnères-de-Luchon in the Pyrenees in France, he became a hermit in the valley of Larboush, where the Saracens martyred him (732)
 Saint Willibald, Bishop of Eichstätt in Bavaria (c. 787)
 Venerable Deochar (Theutger or Gottlieb), a hermit in Franconia in Germany, he became the first abbot of the monastery of Herriedon (847)
 Martyrs Peter, Wallabonsus, Sabinian, Wistremundus, Habentius and Jeremiah, martyred under Abderrahman in Córdoba for publicly denouncing Mohammed (851)
 Venerable Meriadoc (Meriadec), born in Wales, he became a hermit and later Bishop of Vannes in Brittany (c. 886)
 Saint Odo of Massay, Abbot of Massay in France (935-967)

Post-Schism Orthodox saints

 Venerable Anthony (in schema Abramius), monk of Kozhaezersk Monastery (1634)
 Venerable Anastasios Gordios, the "Teacher of the Nation", at Vragiana, Evrytania, Greece (1729)
 Venerable Panagis Bassias, Priest of Cephalonia (1883 or 1888)
 Saint Ioannicius (Rudnyev), Metropolitan of Kiev and Galich (1900)

New martyrs and confessors

 New Hieromartyr Andronicus (Nikolsky), Archbishop of Perm (1918)
 New Hieromartyrs (1918):
 Alexander Osetrov, Valentine Belov, Veniamin Lukanin, Viktor Nikiforov, Alexander Mahetov, Paul Anoshkin, Vladimir Belozerov, Ignatius Yakimov, Michael Denisov, Nicholas Onanyov, Paul Sokolov, Alexander Preobrazhensky, Nicholas Rozhdestvensky, Nicholas Konyukhov, Priests;
 New Hieromartyr Gregory Smirnov, Deacon;
 Martyrs Athanasius Zhulanov and Alexsander Zuev.
 New Hieromartyr Peter Kuznetsov, Priest (1919)

Other commemorations

 Synaxis of the Saints of Ivanovo.
 Repose of Anthony Ivanovich, Fool-for-Christ of Valaam (1832)

Icon gallery

Notes

References

Sources
 June 7/20. Orthodox Calendar (PRAVOSLAVIE.RU).
 June 20 / June 7. HOLY TRINITY RUSSIAN ORTHODOX CHURCH (A parish of the Patriarchate of Moscow).
 June 7. OCA - The Lives of the Saints.
 The Autonomous Orthodox Metropolia of Western Europe and the Americas (ROCOR). St. Hilarion Calendar of Saints for the year of our Lord 2004. St. Hilarion Press (Austin, TX). p. 42.
 The Seventh Day of the Month of June. Orthodoxy in China.
 June 7. Latin Saints of the Orthodox Patriarchate of Rome.
 The Roman Martyrology. Transl. by the Archbishop of Baltimore. Last Edition, According to the Copy Printed at Rome in 1914. Revised Edition, with the Imprimatur of His Eminence Cardinal Gibbons. Baltimore: John Murphy Company, 1916. pp. 166–167.
 Rev. Richard Stanton. A Menology of England and Wales, or, Brief Memorials of the Ancient British and English Saints Arranged According to the Calendar, Together with the Martyrs of the 16th and 17th Centuries. London: Burns & Oates, 1892. pp. 260–261.
Greek Sources
 Great Synaxaristes:  7 ΙΟΥΝΙΟΥ. ΜΕΓΑΣ ΣΥΝΑΞΑΡΙΣΤΗΣ.
  Συναξαριστής. 7 Ιουνίου. ECCLESIA.GR. (H ΕΚΚΛΗΣΙΑ ΤΗΣ ΕΛΛΑΔΟΣ). 
  07/06/2017. Ορθόδοξος Συναξαριστής. 
Russian Sources
  20 июня (7 июня). Православная Энциклопедия под редакцией Патриарха Московского и всея Руси Кирилла (электронная версия). (Orthodox Encyclopedia - Pravenc.ru).
  7 июня по старому стилю / 20 июня по новому стилю. Русская Православная Церковь - Православный церковный календарь на 2016 год.
  7 июня (ст.ст.) 20 июня 2014 (нов. ст.). Русская Православная Церковь Отдел внешних церковных связей. (DECR).

June in the Eastern Orthodox calendar